The women's 1000 meter at the 2018 KNSB Dutch Single Distance Championships took place in Heerenveen at the Thialf ice skating rink on Sunday 29 October 2017. There were 24 participants.

Title holder was Jorien ter Mors. This was her third 1000-meter national title.

Result

  WDR = Withdrew

Source:

References

Single Distance Championships
2018 Single Distance
World